The Ptychitidae is a family of ceratitid ammonites (ammonites sensu lato). They are combined with the Eosagenitidae and Sturiidae in the superfamily Ptychitoidea.

Ptychitid genera have compressed, involute shells in which the inner whorls are covered by the outermost, that may be ribbed or smooth, and ammonitic sutures with secondary elements.

Genera
Arctoptychites
Aristoptychites
Eosturia
Flexoptychites
Istreites
Lanceoptychites
Malletoptychites
Ptychites

References

 Arkell, et al., 1957. Mesozoic Ammonoidea, in the Treatise on Invertebrate Paleontology, Part L . R. C.Moore (ed). Geological Society of America and Univ of Kansas press.
 Ptychitidae-Paleodb
  classification of E.T. Tozer, 1994

Ptychitaceae
Ceratitida families
Middle Triassic first appearances
Late Triassic extinctions